Vladimir Ivanovich Popov (5 June 1930 — 1 April 1987) was a Soviet and Russian animator and art director. A member of ASIFA, He was named Honored Art Worker of the RSFSR in 1986.

Biography
Vladimir Popov grew up in a communal apartment near Soyuzmultfilm. He was fond of painting since childhood and visited an art school. He also produced hand-made cartoons by drawing humorous scenes from the life of his neighbours on a transparent filmstrip and demonstrating them to a great success.

In 1951, Popov was employed by Soyuzmultfilm; for the next ten years he had been working as an animator with Ivan Ivanov-Vano, Alexandra Snezhko-Blotskaya, Leonid Amalrik and other leading directors. Since 1960, he had been directing films together with Vladimir Pekar, also acting as an art director. Their most popular work of that time was Umka (1969), a traditionally animated short about a little polar bear loved by generations of children, along with the lullaby song performed by Aida Vedishcheva.

Since 1975, Popov had been working alone. Among his popular films were adaptations of Nikolay Nosov's Bobik Visiting Barbos (1977) and Yuri Koval's The Adventures of Vasya Kurolesov (1981). Yet his biggest success was the Three from Prostokvashino trilogy produced in 1978—1984 and based on the comedy fairy tales by Eduard Uspensky. Despite the cold reception from the officials, the mini-series became incredibly popular and turned into the source of many catchphrases. It was named the third best animated film/series of all time in the all-Russian poll conducted by the Public Opinion Foundation on February, 2014.

Vladimir Popov died on 1 April 1987 aged 56. His death was sudden and unexpected. He was buried in the family tomb at the Vagankovo Cemetery in Moscow. In 1989, he was posthumously awarded the Vasilyev Brothers State Prize of the RSFSR.

Filmography

Director

 1960: Animated Crocodile No. 1
 1961: The First Time on the Arena 
 1961: Animated Crocodile No. 5
 1962—1986: Fitil
 1966: Letters from the Radio Operator's Box
 1968: It Happened in Winter
 1969: Umka
 1970: Umka is Looking for a Friend
 1971: The Adventures of the Red Ties
 1972: Are You My Enemy or My Friend?
 1972: Robbery in Broad Daylight
 1973: The Treasures of Sunken Ships
 1973: What is Scarier?
 1974: One Fairy Tale After Another
 1974: Stories about Shevchenko
 1975: Return Rex
 1975: The Rainbow
 1976: How the Dwarf Left the House
 1977: Bobik Visits Barbos
 1978: Three from Prostokvashino
 1980: School Holidays in Prostokvashino
 1981: The Adventures of Vasya Kurolesov
 1983: From Two to Five
 1984: The Winter in Prostokvashino
 1985: Sherlock Holmes and I
 1986: Academician Ivanov

References

External links

Vladimir Popov at Animator.ru

 Monsters of Animation. Vladimir Popov at the official 2x2 channel

1930 births
1987 deaths
20th-century Russian artists
20th-century Russian screenwriters
Male screenwriters
20th-century Russian male writers
Artists from Moscow
Recipients of the Vasilyev Brothers State Prize of the RSFSR
Russian animated film directors
Russian animators
Soviet animation directors
Soviet animators
Soviet screenwriters
Burials at Vagankovo Cemetery